The Laplace number (La), also known as the Suratman number (Su), is a dimensionless number used in the characterization of free surface fluid dynamics.  It represents a ratio of surface tension to the momentum-transport (especially dissipation) inside a fluid.

It is defined as follows:

where:
 σ = surface tension
 ρ = density
 L = length
 μ = liquid viscosity

Laplace number is related to Reynolds number (Re) and Weber number (We) in the following way:

See also
 Ohnesorge number - There is an inverse relationship, between the Laplace number and the Ohnesorge number.

Dimensionless numbers of fluid mechanics
Fluid dynamics